Kunnam is a state assembly constituency in Tamil Nadu, India newly formed after constituency delimitations 2008. Its State Assembly Constituency number is 148. It is included in the Perambalur parliamentary constituency. It is one of the 234 State Legislative Assembly Constituencies in Tamil Nadu.

Members of the Legislative Assembly

Election Results

2021

2016

2011

References 

Assembly constituencies of Tamil Nadu